The Group is a Canadian music variety television series which aired on CBC Television from 1968 to 1970.

Premise
Series regulars included Reg Gibson and Karen Marklinger, with the house band The Sassy Brass of Bob
McMullin named after the series musical director. Visiting performers included Lucille Emond, Anita Gass, Georges LaFleche, Ray St. Germain, Buddy Victor and Yvette.

Scheduling
This half-hour series was broadcast on Sundays for three seasons as a mid-season replacement. It aired 23 June to 28 July 1968 at 7:00 p.m., after which the time slot featured Hits a Poppin until September. The remaining seasons aired 3 August to 14 September 1969 at 4:00 p.m. and finally 12 July to 27 September 1970 at 5:30 p.m..

References

External links
 

CBC Television original programming
1968 Canadian television series debuts
1970 Canadian television series endings
1960s Canadian variety television series
Television shows filmed in Winnipeg
1970s Canadian variety television series